Big Pine Key is a census-designated place and unincorporated community in Monroe County, Florida, United States, on an island of the same name in the Florida Keys. As of the 2020 census, the town had a total population of 4,521.

Geography

U.S. 1 (the Overseas Highway) crosses the key at mile markers 29.5–33, one of the few places on the keys where the road orients north–south (along the eastern edge of the Key). The highway leads west-southwest  to Key West and east-northeast  to Marathon.

Big Pine Key was the location of one of the stations of the Overseas Railroad.

Demographics

2020 census

As of the 2020 United States census, there were 4,521 people, 2,065 households, and 1,180 families residing in the CDP.

2000 census
As of the census of 2000,  5,032 people, 2,247 households, and 1,420 families resided in the CDP.  The population density was 198.9/km (515.3/mi2).  The 3,153 housing units averaged 124.6/km (322.9/mi2).  The racial makeup of the CDP was 94.83% White, 1.09% African American, 0.50% Native American, 0.58% Asian, 0.02% Pacific Islander, 1.19% from other races, and 1.79% from two or more races. Hispanics or Latinos of any race were 6.72% of the population.

Of the 2,247 households, 41.4% had children under the age of 18 living with them, 43.8% were married couples living together, 5.7% had a female householder with no husband present, and 6.8% were not families. About 26.0% of all households were made up of individuals, and 7.8% had someone living alone who was 65 years of age or older.  The average household size was 2.21 and the average family size was 2.63.

In the CDP, the population was distributed as 16.8% under the age of 18, 4.3% from 18 to 24, 30.3% from 25 to 44, 33.7% from 45 to 64, and 14.9% who were 65 years of age or older.  The median age was 44 years. For every 100 females, there were 110.4 males.  For every 100 females age 18 and over, there were 111.6 males.

The median income for a household in the CDP was $44,514, and for a family was $47,639. Males had a median income of $31,552 versus $28,021 for females. The per capita income for the CDP was $23,169.  About 5.6% of families and 9.5% of the population were below the poverty line, including 17.4% of those under age 18 and 7.0% of those aged 65 or over.

The Blue Hole

The Blue Hole is an abandoned rock quarry that was used for nearby road fills and Henry Flagler's Overseas Railroad. The water it contains is mostly fresh and is used by various wildlife in the area, such as birds, snakes, alligators and invasive green iguanas. It is part of the National Key Deer Refuge.

Business and commerce
The primary grocery store is the Winn-Dixie, located in a shopping center just north of US 1. This shopping center contains several restaurants, a Beall's Outlet, a former RadioShack store (now Keys Electronics), the visitor's center for the National Key Deer Refuge, and a branch of the Monroe County Library (with WiFi internet access). Walgreens and CVS pharmacies are located along US 1, as well as a shoe store, a tropical decor store, and a bait and tackle shop. A small hardware store in the same area sells typical paint, hardware, tools, other goods needed to build/repair items around the home, and a limited selection of parts for boat repair.

Several bars and restaurants are along the US 1 corridor. Good Food Conspiracy has served organic food for over two decades and the No Name Pub is near the bridge to No Name Key in the northeast part of the island. The nearest city of note is Marathon about 23 miles (37 km) "north" on US 1.  Key West, a major shopping and cultural hub for the area, is about 30 miles (48 km) "south" on US 1.

Accommodations are limited, though RV/camping and a small number of motel-style units are available at the Big Pine Key Fishing Lodge on the far southeast side of the island.

Key deer

The island of Big Pine Key is home to the National Key Deer Refuge. The majority of the Key deer population are found on this island.

As Key deer are endangered, many precautions have been taken to preserve as much Key deer habitat as possible:
Signs are prominently placed along US 1 to inform drivers that they are entering Key deer habitat, and warning them that feeding Key deer is prohibited.
About 2 miles of US 1 on the eastern end of Big Pine Key are elevated and fenced off to allow Key deer to pass under the road.
The stretch of US 1 in Big Pine Key has a night-time speed limit of 35 miles per hour (as Key deer are most active at night) and the speed limits (45 MPH in the day) are "strictly enforced" according to signage.

References

External links

Unincorporated communities in Monroe County, Florida
Census-designated places in Monroe County, Florida
Census-designated places in Florida
Unincorporated communities in Florida
Populated coastal places in Florida on the Atlantic Ocean